Iowa Highway 60 (Iowa 60) is a north–south state highway in northwest Iowa.  The highway runs at a southwest-to-northeast angle.  The southern end of Iowa Highway 60 is near Le Mars at a freeway interchange with U.S. Highway 75 and U.S. Highway 75 Business.  Its northern end is at the Minnesota border just south of Bigelow, Minnesota, where the highway continues in Minnesota as Minnesota State Highway 60.

The highway was designated on January 1, 1969, when it replaced Iowa 33.  It was renumbered to provide a continuous number across the state line into Minnesota.  Since 2004, the highway has been upgraded to expressway status, with some freeway sections, as part of a highway corridor connecting Sioux City with the Twin Cities metropolitan area in Minnesota.

Route description
Iowa 60 begins north of Le Mars at an interchange with U.S. Highway 75 (US 75) and its business loop.  Northbound Iowa 60 is a continuation of northbound US 75, while northbound US 75 traffic must exit to continue on that route.  Iowa 60 heads to the northeast adjacent to the Floyd River along a four-lane expressway.  Over its first , it passes the small town of Seney and acres (hectares) of farmland until it reaches Alton.

It continues northeast, bypassing Hospers and Sheldon. On the Sheldon bypass, it meets U.S. Highway 18. It proceeds north and bypasses Ashton, then continues northeast to bypass Sibley, where it meets Iowa Highway 9. The highway continues northeasterly until ending at the Minnesota border just south of Bigelow, Minnesota.

Exit list

Related route

Iowa Highway 60 Business serves Sheldon, following the old route of Iowa 60 north into Sheldon, then turning east on U.S. 18 to return to Iowa 60.

References

External links

End of Iowa 60 at Iowa Highway Ends

Expressways in the United States
060
Transportation in Plymouth County, Iowa
Transportation in Sioux County, Iowa
Transportation in O'Brien County, Iowa